Starksboro is a town in Addison County, Vermont, United States. The population was 1,756 at the 2020 census.

Geography
Starksboro is located in the northeast corner of Addison County, along the western edge of the Green Mountains. Vermont Route 116 runs through the town center, leading north to Hinesburg and South Burlington and south to Bristol and East Middlebury. Vermont Route 17 crosses the southern part of the town, leading east across the Green Mountains to Mad River Glen ski area and the town of Waitsfield, and west to Bristol and the Champlain Valley.

History
The Town was named after John Stark, a prominent Officer from the New Hampshire Militia during the Revolutionary War.
The Robinson Elementary School is named in honor of Albert J. Robinson, who helped build the school. On November 9th, of 1780, Starksboro was chartered by state legislation.

Demographics

As of the census of 2000, there were 1,898 people, 668 households, and 488 families residing in the town.  The population density was 41.7 people per square mile (16.1/km2).  There were 765 housing units at an average density of 16.8 per square mile (6.5/km2).  The racial makeup of the town was 96.63% White, 0.21% African American, 0.26% Native American, 0.68% Asian, 0.05% Pacific Islander, 0.05% from other races, and 2.11% from two or more races. Hispanic or Latino of any race were 0.21% of the population.

There were 668 households, out of which 42.8% had children under the age of 18 living with them, 59.1% were married couples living together, 8.2% had a female householder with no husband present, and 26.8% were non-families. 17.8% of all households were made up of individuals, and 4.6% had someone living alone who was 65 years of age or older.  The average household size was 2.84 and the average family size was 3.26.

In the town, the age distribution of the population shows 30.6% under the age of 18, 6.9% from 18 to 24, 34.4% from 25 to 44, 22.3% from 45 to 64, and 5.8% who were 65 years of age or older.  The median age was 34 years. For every 100 females, there were 96.7 males.  For every 100 females age 18 and over, there were 100.8 males.

The median income for a household in the town was $44,559, and the median income for a family was $46,771. Males had a median income of $31,424 versus $23,828 for females. The per capita income for the town was $17,688.  About 6.9% of families and 9.8% of the population were below the poverty line, including 12.0% of those under age 18 and 9.3% of those age 65 or over.

Notable people 

 Phineas D. Ballou, mayor of Burlington, Vermont, 1868–1870
 Barbara Cochran, Olympic slalom gold medalist (1972)
 Ryan Cochran-Siegle, Olympic Alpine Skiing competitor
 Clement Hurd, children's author
 Edith Thacher Hurd, children's author
 Thacher Hurd, children's author
 David Mason, stonemason

References

External links
 Town of Starksboro official website
 Starksboro Historical Society
 Starksboro Village Meetinghouse
 Robinson Elementary School

 
Towns in Vermont
Towns in Addison County, Vermont